Lakeway Airpark  is a public use airport in Travis County, Texas, United States. The airport is 17 nautical miles (31 km) west of the central business district of Austin. It is privately owned by Lakeway Airpark, Inc. and is located in Lakeway, Texas.

History and management 

From 1939 to 1946 it was called Airfield Ranch. In the late 1960s the Ranch was purchased to develop an all encompassing getaway resort with golf, marina, lakeside hotel accommodations and airstrip for visitors. The Lakeway Company upgraded and lengthened the runway and the Airpark was considered an amenity for the community.  After the original development failed the project was purchased by Ross Perot. Perot's development company broke up the original properties and sold them off. The golf property is today's Live Oak course, the hotel/resort is the Lakeway Inn.  In 1995 the airstrip property was sold to a group who established Lakeway Airpark LLC,  a not for profit corporation established for the purpose of managing the airpark. Under the terms of the original sale the property may revert to Perot in the event the property is not used as an airport.

The airport briefly had scheduled passenger airline service during the mid 1970s when Bee Line, a small commuter air carrier based in the Houston area, was operating flights on the weekends with small twin prop aircraft from both Houston Hobby Airport and Andrau Airpark in the west Houston area and the Lakeway Airpark.

Facilities and aircraft 
It has one runway designated 16/34 with an asphalt surface measuring 3,930 by 70 feet (1,198 x 21 m).

A  runway was made in 1936. The runway end zones were extended in 2003.

As of 2010 there are 29 residences surrounding the airpark with attached hangars on residential properties.  In addition there are 4 freestanding condo style hangars on the airpark property and 1 large non residential hangar on AV zoned adjoining property not owned by the Airpark.

For the 12-month period ending February 29, 2008, the airport had 9,000 general aviation aircraft operations, an average of 24 per day. At that time there were 58 aircraft based at this airport: 95% single-engine and 5% multi-engine.

References

External links
 Lakeway Airpark, Inc.
 
 

Airports in Texas
Buildings and structures in Travis County, Texas
Greater Austin
Transportation in Travis County, Texas
Airports in Greater Austin